Débéré  is a village and rural commune in the Cercle of Douentza in the Mopti Region of Mali. The commune contains seven villages and in the 2009 census had a population of 5,760. Fulfulde is the main language spoken in the village.

References

External links
.
.

Communes of Mopti Region